The 1989 Minnesota Twins finished 80–82, fifth in the AL West Division. 2,277,438 fans attended Twins games, the 7th highest total in the American League.

Offseason
 October 24, 1988: Eric Bullock, Tom Herr and Tom Nieto were traded by the Twins to the Philadelphia Phillies for Shane Rawley and cash.
 November 3, 1988: Bert Blyleven and Kevin Trudeau (minors) were traded by the Twins to the California Angels for Mike Cook, Paul Sorrento, and Rob Wassenaar (minors).
 December 7, 1988: Jeff Bumgarner (minors), Steve Gasser (minors) and Toby Nivens (minors) were traded by the Twins to the New York Mets for Wally Backman and Mike Santiago (minors).
 December 12, 1988: Randy Bush was signed as a free agent by the Twins.
 December 21, 1988: John Christensen was released by the Twins.
 February 13, 1989: Lee Tunnell was signed as a free agent by the Twins.
March 26, 1989: Keith Atherton was traded by the Minnesota Twins to the Cleveland Indians for Carmelo Castillo.

Regular season

Kirby Puckett tied a major league record when, on May 13, he hit four doubles in a game against the Toronto Blue Jays.  He was the thirty-fifth player to accomplish the feat.

When Jeff Reardon got his 30th save on September 14, he became the first major leaguer to reach 30 saves in five consecutive seasons.

Offense
Puckett led the AL in batting with a .339 average and hits with 215. Kirby hit 9 HR, drove in 85 runs, scored 75, and was rewarded with a Silver Slugger Award. Kent Hrbek hit .272 with 25 HR and 84 RBI. Gary Gaetti hit 19 HR and 75 RBI. Al Newman led the team with 25 stolen bases.

*League leader

Pitching

Only two Twins had double digit wins: Allan Anderson (17-10) and Roy Smith (10-6).
Frank Viola was 8-12 before being traded to the New York Mets on July 31.
Reliever Jeff Reardon had 31 saves.

Defense

Third baseman Gary Gaetti and center fielder Kirby Puckett each won their fourth Gold Glove Award.

Season standings

Record vs. opponents

Notable transactions
 April 1, 1989: Randy St. Claire was signed as a free agent by the Twins.
 June 5, 1989: 1989 Major League Baseball draft
Chuck Knoblauch was drafted by the Twins in the 1st round (25th pick). Player signed June 9, 1989.
Denny Neagle was drafted by the Twins in the 3rd round. Player signed June 22, 1989.
Dan Masteller was drafted by the Twins in the 11th round.
Denny Hocking was drafted by the Twins in the 52nd round. Player signed May 15, 1990.
 June 29, 1989: Freddie Toliver was traded by the Twins to the San Diego Padres for Greg Booker.

Roster

Player stats

Batting

Starters by position
Note: Pos = Position; G = Games played; AB = At bats; H = Hits; Avg. = Batting average; HR = Home runs; RBI = Runs batted in

Other batters
Note: G = Games pitched; AB = At bats; H = Hits; Avg. = Batting average; HR = Home runs; RBI = Runs batted in

Pitching

Starting pitchers 
Note: G = Games pitched; IP = Innings pitched; W = Wins; L = Losses; ERA = Earned run average; SO = Strikeouts

Other pitchers 
Note: G = Games pitched; IP = Innings pitched; W = Wins; L = Losses; ERA = Earned run average; SO = Strikeouts

Relief pitchers 
Note: G = Games pitched; W = Wins; L = Losses; SV = Saves; ERA = Earned run average; SO = Strikeouts

Awards and honors
 Kirby Puckett – American League Batting Champion (.339)
 Gary Gaetti – Gold Glove Award winner, third base
 Kirby Puckett – Gold Glove Award winner, center field
 Kirby Puckett – Silver Slugger Award, outfield

All-Star Game
 Gary Gaetti, third base, reserve
 Kirby Puckett, outfield, starter

Farm system 

LEAGUE CHAMPIONS: Elizabethton

References

External links
Player stats from www.baseball-reference.com
Team info from www.baseball-almanac.com

Minnesota Twins seasons
Minnesota Twins season
1989 in sports in Minnesota